Shakshukuk Island is a Baffin Island offshore island located in the Arctic Archipelago in Nunavut's Qikiqtaaluk Region. It lies in Cumberland Sound, at the mouth of Robert Peel Inlet. Shakshukowshee Island lies along its west side.

References

External links 
 Shakshukuk Island in the Atlas of Canada - Toporama; Natural Resources Canada

Islands of Baffin Island
Islands of Cumberland Sound
Uninhabited islands of Qikiqtaaluk Region